On June 17, 1895 (Meiji 28), Taiwan came under the rule of the Empire of Japan. In the following year on December 3, 1896, the first Shinto shrine was created in Taiwan. This was actually an already existing  located in Tainan but renamed .

Since then, Shinto shrines were built in the major cities between the Meiji and Taishō period, while the majority of Shinto shrines in Taiwan were built from the late 1930s until Japan's defeat in World War II. In total, 204 shrines were built in Taiwan–66 of which were officially sanctioned by the Japanese Empire.

Prince Yoshihisa was sent to Taiwan to subjugate the anti-Japanese rebellion but fell ill and died from malaria in Tainan in 1895. In 1901 (Meiji 34), the Taiwan Shrine (later Taiwan Grand Shrine) was built and Prince Yoshihisa along with the Three Kami Deities of Cultivation were enshrined. Amaterasu was later included in the shrine. The shrines in Taiwan followed in its lead and Prince Yoshihisa became a Saijin in most shrines throughout Taiwan. Furthermore, in Tainan, the place of Prince Yoshihisa's demise, the Tainan Shrine was built.

After Japan's defeat in World War II, the shrines were either abandoned, destroyed or converted into Chinese Martyr Shrines. In 2015, Gaoshi Shrine was reconstructed and became the first Shinto shrine built in Taiwan after World War II.

List of shrines
Below is a list of Shinto shrines which were built during Japanese colonial rule. The shrines were ranked according to their importance such as Grand Shrine (官幣大社 kokuhei taisha), Small Shrine (国幣小社 kokuhei shōsha) and Martyr Shrine (護国神社 gokoku jinja), the last of which was designated by the Governor-General of Taiwan.

Taihoku Prefecture

Shinchiku Prefecture

Taichū Prefecture

Tainan Prefecture

Takao Prefecture

Hōko Prefecture

Taitō Prefecture

Karenkō Prefecture

Enshrined deities

大国主神/大国主命/大己貴命 Ōkuninushi no Kami/Mikoto, Ōnamuchi no Mikoto
大物主命 Ōmononushi no Mikoto
倉稲魂神/倉稲魂命 Ukanomitama no Kami/Mikoto
弥都波能売神 Mizuhanome no Kami
金山彦命 Kanayamahiko no Mikoto
猿田彦命 Sarutahiko no Mikoto
大国魂命 Ōkunimitama no Mikoto
大綿津見神 Ōwatatsumi no Kami
事代主命 Kotoshironushi no Mikoto
大山祇神/大山祇命 Ōyamazumi no Kami/Mikoto
火具津智命 Kagutsuchi no Mikoto
科津彦命 Shinatsuhiko no Mikoto

See also
Shinto
Shinto shrine
Shinto in Taiwan
Sugiura Shigemine
Taiwan under Japanese rule
Political divisions of Taiwan (1895-1945)
Governor-General of Taiwan
Formosan Army

References

Taiwan
 
Shinto shrines